The Ardanabia (also known as Ardanabie, Ardanavie, Ardanavy, Ardanavia) is a left tributary of the Adour, in the French Basque Country, in Aquitaine, Southwest France.

Geography 
The Ardanabia rises in the moors of Hasparren, flows north meandering between Mouguerre and Briscous and joins the Adour below Urcuit.

Name 
The name Ardanabia proceeds from ardan-habia, that can be analyzed as 'river course in vineyards'.

Départements and towns 

 Pyrénées-Atlantiques: Hasparren, Mouguerre, Briscous, Urcuit.

Main tributaries 
 Angeluko Erreka
 Ur Handia

References

Rivers of France
Rivers of Pyrénées-Atlantiques
Rivers of Nouvelle-Aquitaine